Halvor Haug (Trondheim, 20 February 1952) is a Norwegian composer.

Selected works
 Violin Sonata (1973)
 Tre "Utfall" for guitar (1973/74)
 Symphonic Picture (1976)
 Silence for strings (1977)
 Symphonic Contours (1977)
 Impression for Piano Solo (1980)
 Poema Sonoro (1980)
 Poema Patetico (1980)
 Symphony No. 1 (1981/82)
 Cordiale (1982), symphonic band
 Symphony No. 2 (1984)
 Human Dignity and Peace (1985), symphonic epics
 Exit for band (1985)
 String Quartet No. 1 (1985)
 Never Forget Her (1985), song cycle for mezzo-soprano  and orchestra
 Essay for alto trombone and string quartet (1986)
 Furunes sang (Song of the Pines, 1987)
 Insignia (1993)
 Symphony No. 3 'The Inscrutable Life' (1994)
 Piano Trio (1995)
 String Quartet No. 2 (1996)
 Il Preludio dell' Ignoto (2000)
 Symphony No. 4 (2001)
 Symphony No. 5 (2002)

References

1952 births
Living people
Norwegian composers
Norwegian male composers
Musicians from Trondheim